The Christian Democratic Senior League is a Swedish christian democratic organisation primarily for senior members of the Christian Democratic Party. The organisation was founded in 1993 and was the first ever organisation of its type in Sweden. The organisation's aim is to promote issues that concern the elderly and influence the public opinion in those questions. At the end of 2005, the party had 2340 members.

The organisation is a member of the European Senior Citizen's Union (ESCU).

Chairman
 Jerzy Einhorn 1993–2000
 Stig Nyman 2000–2002
 Bror Stefenson 2002–2007
 Leif Hallberg 2007–2013
 Jan Erik Ågren 2013–2015
 Sture Eriksson 2015–2016
 Leif Hallberg 2016–2019
Lars O. Molin 2019-

External links
 Kristdemokratiska Seniorförbundet
 European Senior Union (ESU)

Christian Democrats (Sweden)
Seniors' organizations